Alen Bajkuša (born 26 June 1971, Sarajevo) is a retired footballer, who played as a striker. His career began at FK Željezničar. He later played for the Hong Kong national team.

Club career
Bajkuša joined Hong Kong giants South China in 1994 from Malaysian side Penang. He also played for Golden in Hong Kong.

He later played for SM Caen in the French Ligue 1, but returned to Hong Kong in April 1999 to play for Happy Valley.

International career
He played for Hong Kong in the 1994 Carlsberg Cup and scored for them in the 2000 tournament.

References

External links
 Swiss league stats - SFL Glory
 Hungarian league stats - Futbalmanach
 

1971 births
Living people
Footballers from Sarajevo
Association football forwards
Bosnia and Herzegovina footballers
Hong Kong footballers
Hong Kong international footballers
Hong Kong League XI representative players
FK Željezničar Sarajevo players
Penang F.C. players
Sun Hei SC players
South China AA players
Stade Malherbe Caen players
Étoile Carouge FC players
Happy Valley AA players
FC Tatabánya players
Egaleo F.C. players
NK Široki Brijeg players
Malaysia Super League players
Hong Kong First Division League players
Ligue 1 players
Ligue 2 players
Swiss Challenge League players
Nemzeti Bajnokság I players
Super League Greece players
Premier League of Bosnia and Herzegovina players
Bosnia and Herzegovina expatriate footballers
Expatriate footballers in Malaysia
Bosnia and Herzegovina expatriate sportspeople in Malaysia
Expatriate footballers in Hong Kong
Bosnia and Herzegovina expatriate sportspeople in Hong Kong
Expatriate footballers in France
Bosnia and Herzegovina expatriate sportspeople in France
Expatriate footballers in Switzerland
Bosnia and Herzegovina expatriate sportspeople in Switzerland
Expatriate footballers in Hungary
Bosnia and Herzegovina expatriate sportspeople in Hungary
Expatriate footballers in Greece
Bosnia and Herzegovina expatriate sportspeople in Greece